Cyzicus is a genus of clam shrimps in the family Cyzicidae. Identified by Jean Victoire Audouin in 1837, the genus was reidentified as Caenestheriella by Eugen von Daday in 1910.

There are seven species in the genus:
Cyzicus belfragei (Packard, 1871) – Belfrage clam shrimp	 
Cyzicus californicus (Packard, 1883) – California clam shrimp	 
Cyzicus elongatus (Mattox, 1957 – elongate clam shrimp	 
Cyzicus gynecia (Mattox, 1949) – Mattox clam shrimp	 
Cyzicus mexicanus (Claus, 1860) – Mexican clam shrimp	 
Cyzicus morsei (Packard, 1883) – Morse clam shrimp	 
Cyzicus setosa (Pearse, 1912) – setose clam shrimp

References

Branchiopoda genera
Spinicaudata